Warren Joseph Samuels (September 14, 1933 – August 17, 2011) was an American economist and historian of economic thought. He received a BBA from University of Miami, Miami, FL and obtained his Ph.D. from University of Wisconsin–Madison. After holding academic posts in the University of Missouri, Georgia State University, Atlanta, and University of Miami, he was appointed Professor of Economics in Michigan State University in 1968, where he stayed until his retirement in 1998.

Warren Samuels made contributions to the history of economic thought and the methodology of economics. His work was inspired primarily by his "interest in generating greater clarity as to the economic role of government both in the history of economic thought and in contemporary economics". He described himself as "a self-professed institutionalist (in a blend of several other schools)."

Samuels received the Distinguished Faculty Award from Michigan State University.  He was a founding member of the History of Economics Society, recipient of the Veblen-Commons Award from the Association for Evolutionary Economics and longtime editor of its Journal of Economic Issues.

Major publications
 
 Essays on the History of Economics (with Willie Henderson, Kirk Johnson, and Marianne Johnson, 2004.

 The Economy as a Process of Valuation (with Steven G. Medema and A. Allan Schmid), 1997.
 Economic Thought and Discourse in the Twentieth Century (with Jeff Biddle and Thomas Patchak-Schuster), 1993.
 Gardiner C. Means: Institutionalist and Post-Keynesian (with Steven G. Medema), 1990.
 Pareto on Policy, 1974.
 The Classical Theory of Economic Policy, 1966.

References

Secondary sources
 M. Blaug (ed.) - Who's who in economics (3d edition), 1999.
 Ross Emmett - Biography

External reference
Warren J. Samuels' Homepage at Michigan State University

20th-century American economists
21st-century American economists
Historians of economic thought
Miami University alumni
University of Wisconsin–Madison alumni
University of Missouri faculty
Michigan State University faculty
1933 births
2011 deaths